Morant is a surname. Notable people with the surname include:

 Angela Morant (b. 1941), English actress
 Blake Morant, Dean of George Washington University School of Law
 Breaker Morant, (1864–1902), Australian drover, horseman, bush poet and military officer
 Clarice Morant (1904–2009)
 Edward Morant (cricketer, born 1772) (1772–1855), English amateur cricketer
 George Soulié de Morant (1878-1955), French scholar and diplomat
 Henry Charles Frank Morant (1885-1952), Australian writer and photographer
 Ja Morant (b. 1999), American basketball player
 Johan Morant (b. 1986), French ice hockey defenceman
 Johnnie Morant (b. 1981), American gridiron football player
 Pablo Morant (b. 1970), Argentine footballer
 Philip Morant, (1700–1770), English clergyman, author and historian
 Richard Morant (1945–2011), English actor
 Robert Laurie Morant (1863–1920), English administrator and educationalist

See also

Moran (given name)
Moran (surname)
 Sevenia morantii